Boo-Qwilla is a totem pole created by Art Thompson, installed on the Stanford University campus in Stanford, California, United States. The sculpture was installed in Dohrmann Grove, near Hoover Tower, in 1995. It was cleaned and repainted in 2013.

References

1995 establishments in California
1995 sculptures
Outdoor sculptures in California
Stanford University buildings and structures
Totem poles in the United States